Center for Performance Research is a nonprofit organization founded by Jonah Bokaer and John Jasperse in 2008. CPR is located at 361 Manhattan Avenue in Brooklyn’s first L.E.E.D gold-certified green building of its kind. The  arts facility aims to provide affordable space for rehearsal and performance, innovative arts programming, education and pedagogical engagement with the communities of New York City and abroad, as well as a dynamic new model for sustainable arts infrastructure in dance and performance. As a response to the difficulty in maintaining permanent and affordable space for the arts in New York, CPR advocates for performance at the community level.

References

External links
Official site

Non-profit organizations based in New York City
2008 establishments in New York City
Organizations established in 2008